Gagik II (c. 1025 - May 5/November 24, 1079) was the last Armenian king of the Bagratuni dynasty. Known as Gagik II King of Ani (Ani being the capital of the kingdom at the time) he was enthroned as Gagik II and ruled for a brief period from 1042 to 1045 before the Bagratid dynasty rule collapsed in Armenia.

Historical background
During the reign of Hovhannes-Smbat (John-Smbat), a feudal lord, David, who owned Taik during his battles against the Muslims, gained a large area which stretched all the way to Manzikert. David was a subject of Byzantium and when he died his entire territory was occupied by Basil II, who had resumed the policy of, bit by bit, annexing Armenia to his empire.

This policy of occupation and expansion was also pursued by the successors of Basil II. By the death of Hovhannes-Smbat around 1040 and that of Ashot IV shortly after, Michael V, one of the successors of Basil II, was the emperor cornering Armenia. Michael claimed that the Kingdom of Ani by virtue of the will of Hovhannes-Smbat, was bequeathed to the Byzantine Empire upon his death.

When the Armenian sparapet, Vahram Pahlavuni, prepared the coronation of the successor to Hovhannes-Smbat, the king's nephew, Gagik II, who at that time was only fourteen years old, the Byzantine emperor began supporting vestes Sargis Haykazn, a pro-Byzantine Armenian prince and minister of the former king, who had initially been appointed regent. After this the kingdom of Ani resisted three assaults of the Byzantine Empire, forcing them to retreat. Byzantium exerted its forces to the utmost in order to conquer Armenia and once and for all annexing it to the empire. To this end, they sent a great army to the southern part of Armenia and at the same time convinced the king of Tashir-Dzoraget to attack Ani from the east. At the fierce battle that was fought by the walls of Ani, general Vahram Pahlavuni heavily defeated the Byzantine army, forcing them to leave 20,000 dead behind, according to contemporary Armenian chroniclers. This victory allowed Vahram Pahlavuni along with Catholicos Petros I Getadardz to crown Gagik II king of Armenia and subsequently take the fortress of Ani, which was in the hands of Vest Sargis. Sargis fled to the fortress of St. Mary and was eventually captured.

After this victory, the new Armenian king, together with Vahram, turned toward their second enemy, the Seljuq Turks, who were still intent on conquering the kingdom. In the following two years Gagik reinforced the army and fought against Seljuq hordes. Gregory Pahlavuni nephew of Vahram, defended the fortress of Bjni. The Armenian army hurried to confront the enemy at the location of the present-day Lake Sevan, where the king and his commander split the Armenian army into two units. The first division engaged in a battle with the Seljuq Turks and then pretended to retreat, drawing the Turks in pursuit toward the second army that was lying in ambush. The battle ended with a catastrophic defeat for the Seljuq Turks. In the Kingdom of Vaspurakan, formerly under the protection of the Byzantine Empire where the population had been deserted by the imperial army, the people eagerly anticipated the Armenian king would be driving the Seljuq Turks out of their homeland. Under leadership of Gagik II, known for his courage as "the Lion," the Armenians revolted and the Turks were forced to retreat to Khoy and Salmas.

Deceit of Gagik II

Vahram began negotiations with the new Byzantine emperor Constantine IX Monomachus. Gagik II offered to be a vassal of the emperor, but the Byzantines did not accept it and prepared a new expedition entrusted to the Duke of Iberia, Michael Iasites, but he failed in the face of  Armenian resistance. Emperor Constantine wished to continue the policy of his predecessors and therefore sent an army to conquer Armenia, whilst inciting the Kurdish emir of Dvin, Abu'l-Aswar, to attack Armenia from the east. King Gagik II, however, managed to placate Abu'l-Aswar by sending him gifts. This allowed Gagik to concentrate his forces against the Byzantines, eventually forcing them to flee. Gagik II proved his worth for the throne and the reputation of a fighting king, which had passed on to him from the very first kings in the Bagratuni dynasty. The Byzantines soon realized that if Armenia could not be conquered by force, it could be taken by treachery. Gagik pardoned Vest Sargis, whose loyalties, however, remained with Byzantium, fostering the hope of being appointed as king of Armenia if Byzantium was to conquer Armenia. With the assistance of Vest Sargis, the Byzantine emperor invited Gagik II to Constantinople to sign an allegedly permanent peace-treaty. Gagik II was invited to visit Constantinople. There the emperor demanded that the Armenian king abdicate and hand over the throne to him, and as he refused to do so was thrown into jail. The Byzantines promptly sent an army to Armenia, which was now leaderless.

In lieu of its rightful king, Armenians considered offering the throne of Ani to David I Anhoghin of Lori or to the emir of Dvin, Abu'l-Aswar, married to the sister of David Anhoghin. Even Bagrat IV of Georgia was considered but surprisingly not the Bagratuni King Gagik-Abas II of Kars. The patriarch Petros did not approve of any of the three candidates and finally conceded the delivery to the Byzantines of the city of Ani and other fortresses. With his connivance, the Byzantines were finally able to occupy Ani in 1045. The country was incorporated into the empire.

Despite not having been considered for the position, Gagik-Abas of Kars claimed the position of king of all of Armenia following Gagik's abdication. Twenty years later in 1065, Gagik-Abas also abdicated and ceded his lands to the Byzantine Empire.

Exile years
Gagik received as compensation for his kingdom the district of Lycandus in Asia Minor as well as the lands in Tzamandos, Larissa, Amaseia and Comana in the vicinity of Caesarea in 1064. it was in Tzamandos that the new catholicos Gregory II the Martyrophile was consecrated in 1065. Gagik was also granted the use of a palace on the Bosphorus in Constantinople and a pension from the imperial treasury. Several seals testify "Kakikios Aniotes" (Gagik of Ani) as duke of the thema of Charsianon. During his time in exile, according to Matthew of Edessa, Gagik also took part in a theological debate between him and the Byzantine emperor in Constantinople, defending the Armenian Church and its tradition and rites.

The Metropolitan of Caesarea, named Markos, lost no occasion to express his scorn toward Gagik, whom he considered a heretic. After several insults by Markos directed against him, Gagik eventually murdered the bishop, an act that made Gagik even more unpopular among the locals. As the story goes, it is said the Bishop had a dog named Armen, so as to scorn the Armenians. One day, Gagik visited the bishop, had the dog put in a canvas bag and beat with sticks. He then had the Bishop seized and placed in the same bag with the dog, now maddened by pain. The bishop died in pain from the wounds inflicted by his own dog. Gagik was captured and later killed on May 5/November 24, 1079 by the Byzantine governors (three brothers) of Kyzistra, who had his body mutilated and hanged from the fort for others to see. His body was later buried outside the fort but was later said to have been secretly conveyed by an Armenian from Ani named Banik to a convent he had built in a city called Pizu.

Shortly after Gagik was killed, his youngest son David was poisoned by his father-in-law for suspected treachery. Gagik's eldest son Hovhannes had married the daughter of Ablgharib, the Byzantine-appointed Orthodox Armenian governor of Tarsus and Mamistra. Hovhannes had a son Ashot who was poisoned and his body brought to Pizu. Hovhannes did not survive his son by long, at which time the posterity of the senior male Bagratian line of kings of Armenia was extinct.

During the reign of Thoros I of the Armenian Kingdom of Cilicia the death of king Gagik II was avenged by the Armenian forces who took the fortress of Kyzistra and executed the three Byzantines who had killed the last Armenian King of Ani.

In fiction
Gagik appears as a character in Ani Betrayed, Bagrat Ayvaziants' novel which chronicles the fall of Ani and the Bagratid line.

References

Bagratuni dynasty
Kings of Bagratid Armenia
11th-century Armenian people
11th-century monarchs in Asia